Peterborough United Football Club is an English association football club based in Peterborough, Cambridgeshire. After former Southern League club Peterborough & Fletton United folded in 1932, there had been no senior football in the Peterborough area. In the summer of 1934, a new professional club, named Peterborough United, was founded to take its place. It was welcomed into membership of the Midland League for 1934–35, and the club's first team finished that initial season in mid-table. They entered the national cup competition, the FA Cup, the following season, but lost their opening match 3–0 at home to Rushden Town in the first qualifying round. When competitive football resumed after the Second World War, Peterborough enjoyed improved performances in both league and cup competition. In the cup, they regularly reached the rounds proper, and progressed to the fourth round in 1956–57 and 1959–60, eliminating two Football League teams on the first occasion and three on the second. In the Midland League, they finished second in 1953–54, third the following year, and then embarked on a run of five consecutive championships, scoring more than 100 goals in each campaign. Repeated attempts at election to the Football League failedalbeit narrowly in 1958–59until they finally gained admission to the Fourth Division in 1960 at the expense of Gateshead.

Their momentum continued into the new Football League season: in second place with Christmas approaching, Peterborough did not lose again until the following April. They won the Fourth Division title, scoring what remains a Football League record 134 goals. Terry Bly supplied 52 of those 134not a league record, but a seasonal total which has not been surpassed since. They followed up with four top-half finishes at the higher level before dropping to mid-table, eliminated Arsenal among others on their way to the sixth round (quarter-final) of the 1964–65 FA Cup, and went one step further in the 1965–66 League Cup, losing to West Bromwich Albion in the semifinal, but problems off the field disrupted their further progress. In November 1967, the Football Association and Football League met to consider charges of making illegal payments to players, poor accounting practices and poor internal governance, stemming from claims surrounding an FA Cup match against Sunderland the previous January. They decided that Peterborough would be demoted to the Fourth Division at the end of the 1967–68 season. At the time, they stood fourth in the Third Division after 19 matches. They won their second Fourth Division championship in 1973–74, this time spending five years in the Third before returning to the fourth tier until 1991.

Back-to-back promotionsvia a fourth-place finish in 1990–91 and the play-offs in 1992, beating Stockport County 2–1 in the final,earned Peterborough a place in the second tier for the first time in the club's history. They came 10th in what was called the First Divisionwhen the newly formed FA Premier League split from the Football League, the remaining divisions of the Football League were renumbered upwardswhich remains the team's highest league finish. and were relegated in 1993–94. They returned to the second tier, which by then had been rebranded as the Football League Championship, in 2009, again after two consecutive promotions. Although relegated straight back to League One, they were immediately re-promoted, and stayed up for two seasons. Failure in the 2014 play-offs was offset by a first ever victory in a nationally organised cup competition: Peterborough defeated Chesterfield by three goals to one in the final of the 2013–14 Football League Trophy, a competition open to clubs in the third and fourth tiers of English football. They returned to the Championship as 2020–21 League One runners-up.

As of the end of the 2020–21 season, the team have spent 25 seasons in the fourth tier of the English football league system, 31 in the third, and 5 in the second. The table details the team's achievements and the top goalscorer in senior first-team competitions from their debut season in the Midland League in 1934–35 to the end of the most recently completed season.

Key

Key to league record:
P – Played
W – Games won
D – Games drawn
L – Games lost
F – Goals for
A – Goals against
Pts – Points
Pos – Final position
Key to colours and symbols:

Key to divisions:
Mid – Midland League
Div 3 – Football League Third Division
Div 4 – Football League Fourth Division
Champ – Championship
League 1 – League One
League 2 – League Two

Key to stages of competitions:
Group – Group stage
Prelim – Preliminary round
QR1 – First qualifying round
QR2 – Second qualifying round, etc.
R1 – First round
R2 – Second round, etc.
QF – Quarter-final
SF – Semi-final
F – Runners-up
W – Winners
(S) – Southern section of regionalised stage

Details of the abandoned 1939–40 season are shown in italics and appropriately footnoted.

Seasons

Notes

References

External links
Peterborough United F.C. official website

Seasons
 
Peterborough United